Die Fledermaus is a 1931 French-German musical film directed by Karel Lamač and starring Anny Ondra, Georg Alexander, and Oskar Sima. It is an operetta film based on the 1874 stage work Die Fledermaus by Johann Strauss.

Cast

References

Bibliography

External links

1931 films
1930s historical musical films
German historical musical films
French historical musical films
Films of the Weimar Republic
1930s German-language films
Films directed by Karel Lamač
Operetta films
Films based on operettas
Films set in the 19th century
French multilingual films
German multilingual films
Bavaria Film films
German black-and-white films
French black-and-white films
1931 multilingual films
1930s German films
1930s French films